Livestock is a live album by British jazz fusion group Brand X released in 1977. The album has five tracks. It is the first album on which Kenwood Dennard appears as a replacement drummer for Phil Collins on two of the five tracks. The recordings on the album come from Brand X's 1977 European and North American tour.

Track listing

Personnel
 John Goodsall – electric guitar
 Robin Lumley – keyboards
 Percy Jones –  bass guitar
 Phil Collins – drums (tracks 2-4)
 Kenwood Dennard – drums (tracks 1,5)
 Morris Pert – percussion

Production
Mixed at Trident Studios, London, August 1977.
 Engineer – Jerry Smith
 Assistants – John Brand, Steve Short, Neil Ross
 Sleeve design and photos by Hipgnosis
 Equipment – Steve Hall, Pete Donovan

X-CERPTS: 3 From Livestock + 1
A 12" record, titled X-CERPTS: 3 From Livestock + 1, was released including edited versions of three tracks from Livestock and a previously unreleased studio track.

Side I: "Nightmare Patrol" - 3:17; "Genocide of the Straights" - 2:50 (previously unreleased)

Side II: "Euthanasia Waltz" - 3:25; "Malaga Virgen" - 3:20

Notes
 "Nightmare Patrol", "Ish", and "Isis Mourning" are all unique tracks not found on any other Brand X album. "Malaga Virgen" and "Euthanasia Waltz" are found on the previous two studio albums.

References

External links
 

Albums with cover art by Hipgnosis
Brand X albums
1977 live albums
Charisma Records live albums
Passport Records live albums
Caroline Records live albums
Albums recorded at the Hammersmith Apollo
Albums recorded at Ronnie Scott's Jazz Club
Live albums recorded at The Marquee Club